Paul Corbould is a British special effects supervisor best known for his work on major blockbuster films such as Children of Men (2006), Captain America: The First Avenger (2011), Thor: The Dark World (2013), and most recently Guardians of the Galaxy (2014). He is a brother of Oscar-winning special effect supervisors Chris Corbould and Neil Corbould.

For his work in Guardians of the Galaxy, he achieved critical success and received his first Best Visual Effects nomination at the 87th Academy Awards which he shared with Stephane Ceretti, Jonathan Fawkner and Nicolas Aithadi. He was nominated at the 68th British Academy Film Awards in same category with Stephane, Jonathan and Nicolas.

Special effects filmography

Accolades

References

External links
 

Living people
Special effects people
Year of birth missing (living people)